Great Eagle may refer to:

 Great Eagle (car company), an American automobile manufacturer from 1910 to 1915
 Great Eagle Holdings, a Hong Kong real estate company
 Great Eagle Centre, an office building in Hong Kong
 Maimonides (1138–1204), Sephardic Jewish philosopher, astronomer and personal physician to Saladin, sometimes known as "haNesher haGadol" ("the Great Eagle")
 Jacob Pavlovich Adler (1855–1926), Jewish actor nicknamed "nesher hagodol" ("the Great Eagle")
 The Great Eagle, leader of the Eagles in Middle-earth in J. R. R. Tolkien's fictional universe; the beings are often referred to collectively as the "Great Eagles"
 Great Eagle, a supernatural being in Native American Chumash traditional narratives
 Great Eagle, a totem animal who advises the protagonist of Yakari, a Franco-Belgian comic book series

See also
 The riddle of the Great Eagle in Ezekiel 17 in the Old Testament

Lists of people by nickname